Bryan Doyle (born 20 October 1968) is an Australian former cricketer. He played six first-class cricket matches for Victoria between 1994 and 1996.

See also
 List of Victoria first-class cricketers

References

External links
 

1968 births
Living people
Australian cricketers
Victoria cricketers
Cricketers from Melbourne